The Boonville Daily News is an American daily newspaper published in Boonville, Missouri, United States. Founded in 1919, it is owned by CherryRoad Media.

The Daily News covers Cooper and Howard counties in central Missouri.

External links 
 

Newspapers published in Missouri
Cooper County, Missouri
Newspapers established in 1919
Gannett publications
1919 establishments in Missouri
Daily News